Marianne Johnson is a former camogie player, All Ireland medalist and member of the Kildare team of the century.

Career
The daughter of Callan County Kilkenny hurler Thomas Johnson who moved to Kildare, founder of the Éire Óg club in Prosperous, she played for Scoil Mhuire, Clane and for Kildare in their breakthrough 1987 All Ireland Junior championship winning final against Armagh. She was selected on the Kildare camogie team of the century in 2004.  She won Leinster junior championship medals in 1981, 1986 and 1987 and captained Kildare in their first, unsuccessful All Ireland final appearance in 1986. She won Gael Linn Cup medals with Leinster. She later served as secretary of Kildare camogie board.

References

External links
 Camogie.ie Official Camogie Association Website
 Wikipedia List of Camogie players

Living people
Year of birth missing (living people)
Kildare camogie players